Memoari porodice Milić (Memoirs of the Milić Family) is a family sitcom that was first broadcast on Televizija Sarajevo from 20 October 1990 to 2 March 1991.

Episodes

References

External links

1990s Bosnia and Herzegovina television series
Bosnia and Herzegovina television sitcoms
1990 Yugoslav television series debuts
Television shows set in Sarajevo
Radio and Television of Bosnia and Herzegovina original programming